The 2001 Women's Five Nations Championship was the third and final series of the rugby union Women's Five Nations Championship and was won by , who achieved the Grand Slam. It should have been a six nations championship, but for the second year running Ireland withdrew from some fixtures.

Final table

Results

See also
Women's Six Nations Championship
Women's international rugby

References

External links
The official RBS Six Nations Site

2001
2001 rugby union tournaments for national teams
2000–01 in English rugby union
2000–01 in Welsh rugby union
2000–01 in Scottish rugby union
2000–01 in French rugby union
2000–01 in European women's rugby union
rugby union
rugby union
rugby union
2000–01 in Spanish rugby union
International women's rugby union competitions hosted by Spain
rugby union
rugby union
Women's Five Nations
Women's Five Nations
Women's Five Nations